Radosa is a genus of moths of the family Erebidae. The genus was described by Nye in 1975.

Species
Radosa albicosta (Hampson, 1924) Panama
Radosa ordinata (Walker, 1865) Brazil (Amazonas)

References

Calpinae